Vårdö is an island municipality of Åland, an autonomous territory of Finland.

The municipality is unilingually Swedish.

Two notable Finnish authors, Sally Salminen and Anni Blomqvist, were born in Vårdö. Blomqvist lived her whole life on the Vårdö island of Simskäla.

The word "vårdö" means "the guardian island". On the highest mountain of Vårdö people used to light bonfires to warn the other islands of danger.

The old post route from Stockholm to Turku went through Vårdö, by road from Båthusviken to Hullvik on the main island, otherwise by water. The local citizens took care of the mail transport in any type of weather. The dangerous mail transport lasted for over 300 years (1638–1910). Many people drowned on these journeys and in the memory of them the municipality of Vårdö has erected a memorial on the seashore of Hullvik. Today the post route road is marked with milestones.

References

External links

Municipality of Vårdö – Official website

Municipalities of Åland